West Records is a record label in the Republic of Belarus.

Activity 
The company is engaged in production and promotion of the releases of Belarusian bands and performers. Many of the most popular Belarusian records of the 2000s, including the domestic tribute to Depeche Mode, albums of J:морс, Тяни-Толкай, Atlantica, N.R.M., Krambambula, beZ bileta, Hair Peace Salon with Jitters, Open Space, and many others, were released on the label. At the same time, the label aims to present the widest possible range of Belarusian music, from ska to opera, in its catalogue.

West Records is also a distributor of world-famous labels, such as Sony BMG, Universal, EMI, across the territory of Belarus.

As Belorusskaya Gazeta’s Jeliena Ankudo reported in 2003, the State Control Committee of the Republic of Belarus imposed a fine of more than $600000 on the company for violations in its financial and economic activities.

In 2010 the label together with the portal TUT.BY produced the show «» with the participation of Belarusian show business personalities.

Recognition 
According to the presented results of the editorial awards by the music portal Experty.by, West Records was named the best record label of the year three times in a row (in 2008, 2009 and 2010).

In 2010 Oleg Klimov, ex-chief editor of Muzykalnaya Gazeta, as a columnist over at naviny.by named the label, in whose catalogue mediocre albums are rare, “outstanding.”

References

External links 
 West Records at Prastora.by

1996 establishments in Belarus
Record labels established in 1996
Belarusian record labels
World music record labels
EMI
Sony Music
Universal Music Group